Richard Clarkin is a Canadian actor. He is most noted for his performance in the 2017 film The Drawer Boy, for which he won the Canadian Screen Award for Best Supporting Actor at the 7th Canadian Screen Awards in 2019.

Career 
Clarkin's other roles include Andrew Jackson in the television mini-series War of 1812, Paul in Finn's Girl, Rich Cook in Ordinary Days, Inspector Davis in Murdoch Mysteries, Gord Ogilvey in Goon and Goon: Last of the Enforcers, Ben in Easy Land, Walter Hawthorne in Naturally, Sadie, and Dick Dunphy in Son of a Critch.

He was a Dora Mavor Moore Award nominee for Outstanding Performance by a Male in a Principal Role – Play (Large Theatre) in 2018 for his performance in Confederation & Riel. He also played Jacob Mercer in the premiere production of David French's Salt-Water Moon in 1984.

Filmography

Film

Television

References

External links

Canadian male film actors
Canadian male television actors
Canadian male stage actors
Canadian male voice actors
Male actors from Toronto
Living people
Year of birth missing (living people)
Best Supporting Actor Genie and Canadian Screen Award winners
20th-century Canadian male actors
21st-century Canadian male actors